Linton Buchanan is a West Indian cricketer. He made his List A debut for Combined Campuses and Colleges in the 2018–19 Regional Super50 tournament on 4 October 2018.

References

External links
 

Year of birth missing (living people)
Living people
Combined Campuses and Colleges cricketers
Place of birth missing (living people)